Argentinomyia  is a small genus of hoverflies.

Species
A. agonis (Walker, 1849)
A. altissimus (Fluke, 1945)
A. berthae (Lima, 1946)
A. bolivariensis (Fluke, 1945)
A. browni Fluke, 1945
A. catabomba (Williston, 1891)
A. columbianus (Enderlein, 1938)
A. crenulatus (Williston, 1891)
A. currani (Fluke, 1937)
A. fastigata Fluke, 1945
A. festivus (Fluke, 1945)
A. funereus (Hull, 1949)
A. grandis Lynch Arribalzaga, 1892
A. lanei Fluke, 1936
A. lineatus (Fluke, 1937)
A. longicornis Walker, 1837
A. luculentus (Fluke, 1945)
A. maculatus (Walker, 1852)
A. melanocera (Williston, 1891)
A. neotropicus (Curran, 1937)
A. nigrans (Fluke, 1945)
A. octomaculata (Enderlein, 1938)
A. opacus (Fluke, 1945)
A. peruvianus (Shannon, 1927)
A. pollinosa Hull, 1947
A. praeustus (Loew, 1866)
A. rex (Fluke, 1945)
A. rugosonasus (Williston, 1891)
A. scitulus (Williston, 1888)
A. testaceipes Lynch Arribalzaga, 1891
A. thiemei (Enderlein, 1938)
A. tropicus (Curran, 1937)

References

Diptera of South America
Hoverfly genera
Syrphinae